Bygdanytt is a Norwegian newspaper, published in Indre Arna in Bergen, and covering Arna and Osterøy. The newspaper was founded in 1951, and its first editor was Sigurd Mjeldheim. The newspaper is issued twice a week. It had a circulation of 4,587 in 2008. Its editor is Hallvard Tysse.

In 2012, Bygdanytt was awarded the prize of best local newspaper at European Newspaper Award.

References

External links
 Official website

1951 establishments in Norway
Newspapers published in Bergen
Norwegian-language newspapers
Publications established in 1951